Amir Habib Jamal (26 January 1922 – 21 March 1995) was a Tanzanian politician and diplomat who served as a Minister under various portfolios in the Julius Nyerere administration. He represented the parliamentary constituency of Morogoro from 1960 to 1985, and was Tanzania's longest-serving Finance Minister and led the ministry for about 12 years.

Early life
Jamal was born in British administered Tanganyika, which was at the time a League of Nations mandate. He was born to Gujarati parents of Indian ancestry. He was the son of Kulsum Thawer and Habib Jamal, a founding member of the Asian Association. He was educated in his hometown of Mwanza and pursued his secondary education in Dar es Salaam. He graduated from the University of Calcutta in India with a BCom in economics.

He had intended to train as a doctor at the University of Bombay but despite his high marks, he didn't get into the medical faculty. In 1942, he attended a meeting of the Indian National Congress where Mahatma Gandhi launched the Quit India Movement, demanding the immediate withdrawal of the British from India. Upon graduation, he returned to Dar es Salaam and joined the family business.

He first met Julius Nyerere in 1952 at a reception hosted by the British Council in honour of the latter's return as a graduate of Edinburgh University. He was a veteran of Tanganyika's independence movement and in 1955, "helped to pay for Nyerere's visit to the United Nations" in New York City, USA.

At first, Jamal had "leanings towards Fabian Society"; but thereafter joined the Asian Association. In 1958, he was elected to the Legislative Council. In 1962, Jamal joined the Tanganyika African National Union (TANU) as its first non-African member.

Career

Political
In 1965, Jamal was appointed as Minister of Finance. Two years later, the Arusha Declaration was proclaimed and the nation adopted a socialist path. Between 1972 and 1975, he was appointed as Minister for Commerce and Industries; and in this capacity he initiated a number of industrial projects in Morogoro Region. He led the Finance Ministry once again between 1975 and 1977. Following the dissolution of the former East African Community in 1977, he was transferred to the Communication and Transport docket which he led for about two years. He had an arduous task of creating new national corporations and agencies. He led the Finance Ministry for a third time between 1979 and 1983.

In 1980, he served as Chairman of the 35th Annual Meetings of the International Monetary Fund (IMF) and the World Bank Group. Upon his arrival in Washington, D.C., he was surprised when IMF staff presented him with a draft for his opening speech. He politely declined saying that he had brought his own. As Chairman, his instruction to invite the Palestine Liberation Organization as an observer to the annual meeting was refused by the World Bank President. He denounced the IMF as a relic of World War II designed to protect the West.

Between 1983 and 1984, Jamal served as Minister without Portfolio and as Minister of State for Cabinet Affairs from 1984 to 1985.

Diplomatic
In 1985, he was appointed as Head of the country's Permanent Mission to the United Nations Office in Geneva.

He served as Chair of both the InterPress Service and Governing Council of the Sokoine University of Agriculture. He was also the Honorary Executive Director of the South Centre and a trustee of the Dag Hammarskjöld Foundation from 1978 to 1993.

Personal life
He married twice and had three sons and one daughter. He was a member of the Khoja community and an adherent of  Nizari Isma'ilism.

Jamal died on 21 March 1995 in Vancouver, British Columbia, Canada at the age of 73. According to Sophia Mustafa, Nyerere's efforts to have Jamal's remains repatriated to Tanzania were in vain. Nyerere in his tribute called him a "person of absolute integrity.. never a Yes man" and was "privileged to count him a friend". Prominent Tanzanian scholar and writer Godfrey Mwakikagile described him as "more of a technocrat than a politician".

In another one of his books,  The People of Ghana: Ethnic Diversity and National Unity, in which he has also written about Nyerere's and Nkrumah's shared Pan-African commitment and uncompromising stand against racism, Godfrey Mwakikagile also states the following about Amir H. Jamal:

"Amir H. Jamal was the most intellectual cabinet member in the first independence cabinet besides Nyerere and the longest-serving minister of finance in the country's history. He held other high-profile ministerial posts and was one of the most respected and most knowledgeable cabinet members....He was a close friend of Nyerere.    
	
A technocrat of high intellectual calibre, he was independent-minded and the best adviser Nyerere had. He had sharp political instincts but as a public servant never did anything for political expediency. His integrity was unimpeachable. I knew him when I was a news reporter."

Joan Wicken, President Nyerere's personal assistant and secretary for decades since before and after independence until Mwalimu Nyerere's death, stated the following about Amir H. Jamal:

"Amir was a key ally of Baba wa Taifa (Father of the Nation) and had more formal and informal one-to-one meetings with Baba wa Taifa than any other minister."

Clement George Kahama who, like Amir H. Jamal, was a member of the first independence cabinet and held other posts in subsequent years under President Nyerere, had this to say about Jamal:

"The late Amir Jamal was an intellectual giant who was highly respected by Mwalimu and all of us, his fellow (cabinet) ministers, for his diplomacy, down to earth-ness and outspoken approach to local and international affairs. It was always intellectually stimulating to discuss global issues with him."

Trevor Huddleston who, with Julius Nyerere when he was a young man before leading Tanganyika to independence, launched an international campaign in London in 1959 to boycott apartheid South Africa, and was himself a very close friend of Nyerere and a world-renowned opponent of the apartheid regime and a highly respected Anglican bishop, said this about Amir Jamal:

"No one in his life in politics had a closer relationship with Mwalimu Nyerere than did Amir Jamal."

Honors and awards

Honours

Honorary degrees

Gallery

References

Bibliography

External links

 Jamal with Andy Chande, 1964 (image)
 Amir Jamal and Y B Chavan  sign a friendship and co-operation agreement (video)
 Opening address by Amir Jamal, Chairman of the 35th Annual IMF and WBG Meetings, p. 4
 Exposing the IMF and World Bank, an Address by Amir Jamal, Finance Minister of Tanzania

1922 births
1995 deaths
People from Mwanza Region
Tanganyika African National Union politicians
Chama Cha Mapinduzi politicians
Finance Ministers of Tanzania
University of Calcutta alumni
Tanzanian Ismailis
Tanzanian politicians of Indian descent
Expatriates in India
Khoja Ismailism
Gujarati people